Rockwood Park is a city park in Saint John, New Brunswick. It is 2,200 acres (890 hectares) in size, with ten lakes and 55 trails and footpaths. The park includes upland Acadian mixed forest, several hills and several caves, as well as freshwater lakes, with a trail network, and a golf course.

It is located in the eastern area of the North End and is one of Canada and New Brunswick's largest urban parks. It is also a Stonehammer Geopark site.

The park is open from dawn until dusk and has free parking. Visitors can enter and exit from either the Lake Drive at Lily Lake or Hawthorne Avenue Extension at Fisher Lakes. Paved pathways connect to amenities such as the Interpretation Centre, the Kiwanis Play Park, and the Bark Park.

History
The park was designed by Calvert Vaux, one of the designers of New York City's Central Park, in the mid-19th century.  The park was initially established around Lily Lake during the late 19th century, and was named in a vote by citizens in the area around the park.

Lily Lake was one of the first sources of fresh water for Saint John.  It was hauled from the lake by tanks and sold for 1 cent a bucket.  In 1907, a court battle ensued as to who had the rights to the ice in Lily Lake; the ice cutters or the skaters.  Although the ice cutters had been granted permission to erect an ice block conveyor in previous years, the skaters won and for decades the lake was center for outdoor winter recreation.

In 1926, the speed skater Charles Gorman, won the World Speed Skating Championship on Lily Lake. It was estimated that 25,000 people turned out on February 7, 1926, to watch him take the championship, setting a world record in the 220 and 440 yard events.

Lily Lake Pavilion 

Sitting on the shores of the Lily Lake in Rockwood Park is the Lily Lake Pavilion venue which has dining and spa options.

The Lily Lake Pavilion is a registered charity that provides educational and recreational programs for children, seniors and families in Saint John.

Venues

Lily Lake Pavilion
Lily Lake Spa
Fisher Lake Pavilion
Inside Out Nature Center (Rock-climbing, guided hikes, outdoor equipment and boat rental)  
Beaches at Fisher Lake and Lily Lake
Campground
Golf course and driving range

See also
American Water Landmark - Lily Lake Reservoir (awarded 1982)

References

External links

 Rockwoodpark.ca

Parks in Saint John, New Brunswick
Articles needing infobox zoo